The Europe Zone was one of the two regional zones of the 1936 International Lawn Tennis Challenge.

19 teams entered the Europe Zone, with the winner going on to compete in the Inter-Zonal Final against the winner of the America Zone. Germany defeated Yugoslavia in the final, and went on to face Australia in the Inter-Zonal Final.

Draw

First round

Spain vs. Germany

Monaco vs. Netherlands

France vs. China

Second round

Ireland vs. Sweden

Switzerland vs. Denmark

Greece vs. Argentina

Germany vs. Hungary

Netherlands vs. France

Yugoslavia vs. Czechoslovakia

Norway vs. Belgium

Austria vs. Poland

Quarterfinals

Ireland vs. Switzerland

Germany vs. Argentina

France vs. Yugoslavia

Austria vs. Belgium

Semifinals

Germany vs. Ireland

Austria vs. Yugoslavia

Final

Yugoslavia vs. Germany

References

External links
Davis Cup official website

Davis Cup Europe/Africa Zone
Europe Zone
International Lawn Tennis Challenge